W Virginis variables are a subclass of Type II Cepheids which exhibit pulsation periods between 10–20 days, and are of spectral class F6 – K2.

They were first recognized as being distinct from classical Cepheids by Walter Baade in 1942, in a study of Cepheids in the Andromeda Galaxy that proposed that stars in that galaxy were of two populations.

See also
Low-dimensional chaos in stellar pulsations

References

External links
 AAVSO Variable Star of the Month. W Virginis: Spring 2003 PDF / HTML
 OGLE Atlas of Variable Star Light Curves - W Virginis stars